WRJA-FM (88.1 FM) is a non-commercial news/talk-formatted radio station located in Sumter, South Carolina, United States, that covers both Columbia and Florence, South Carolina. The station is the flagship of the statewide "NPR News network" from South Carolina Public Radio.

Station history
The station signed on as WMPR on August 25, 1975, as part of the South Carolina Educational Radio Network, featuring programming from SCERN as well as National Public Radio (NPR). It became WRJA-FM in 1980.

In 2001, the station (along with WJWJ-FM Beaufort/Charleston and WHMC Conway/Myrtle Beach) began a separate program schedule from the rest of the SCERN stations, with a format of NPR news, talk and information.

References

External links
South Carolina Public Radio Network website

South Carolina Educational Television
RJA-FM
Radio stations established in 1975
NPR member stations